The Adagio in B minor, K. 540, is a composition for piano solo by Wolfgang Amadeus Mozart. He entered it into his Verzeichnis aller meiner Werke (Catalogue of all my Works) on 19 March 1788.

The key of B minor is very rare in Mozart's compositions; it is used in only one other instrumental work, the slow movement from the Flute Quartet No. 1 in D major, K. 285.

The Austrian composer and academic Gerhard Präsent has made an arrangement for string quartet in four movements Fantasy Quartet in D in which this piece acts as the third one.

The autograph is at the  Library, Stockholm.

References

External links
 
 
 , played by Vladimir Horowitz on 26 October 1986, Orchestra Hall, Chicago

Compositions by Wolfgang Amadeus Mozart
Compositions for solo piano
1788 compositions
Compositions in B minor